The 2015–16 Southern Illinois Salukis men's basketball team represented Southern Illinois University Carbondale during the 2015–16 NCAA Division I men's basketball season. The Salukis, led by fourth year head coach Barry Hinson, played their home games at the SIU Arena and were members of the Missouri Valley Conference. They finished the season 22–10, 11–7 in Missouri Valley play to finish in a tie for fourth place. They lost in the quarterfinals of the Missouri Valley tournament to Northern Iowa. Despite having 22 wins, citing financial concerns and player fatigue, they chose not to participate in a postseason tournament.

Previous season
The Salukis finished the 2015–16 season 12–21, 4–14 in MVC play to finish in ninth place. They advanced to the quarterfinals of the Missouri Valley tournament where they lost to Northern Iowa.

Departures

Incoming transfers

Recruiting

Roster

Schedule and results

|-
!colspan=12 style=| Exhibition

|-
!colspan=12 style=| Non-conference regular season

|-
!colspan=12 style=| Missouri Valley Conference regular season

|-
!colspan=12 style=|  Missouri Valley tournament

References

Southern Illinois Salukis men's basketball seasons
Southern Illinois
Southern Illinois Salukis men's basketball
Southern Illinois Salukis men's basketball